The Antwerps Sportpaleis, also called Sportpaleis Antwerpen, Sportpaleis Merksem or simply the Sportpaleis, is an arena in Antwerp, Belgium. It is a multipurpose hall where concerts, sporting events, festivals and fairs are organized. The arena was built for sport, especially track cycling, but there is now little sport there, an exception being the Diamond Games tennis.

According to Billboard Magazine, for the period 2007/8 Sportpaleis was the second most visited event hall in the world, second only to Madison Square Garden. The Sportpaleis is known for performances by both Dutch-speaking and international artists. It also hosts the Nekka-Nacht, the Proximus Diamond Games tennis tournament for women and Pop Poll De Luxe, organised by the magazine HUMO.

The arena is elliptical and has two floors. Until renovations in 2011, there was a  wooden cycling track under the stands.

Next to the Sportpaleis is its sister venue, the Lotto Arena, a hall that can accommodate 8,000 spectators.

History

Construction of the arena started on 11 January 1932. It lasted 21 months and was completed on 11 September 1933, becoming the largest indoor arena in Europe. The Sportpaleis was built by the Apostel-Mampaey family from Boom. They were internationally renowned velodrome builders from 1907 until the Second World War. The velodrome builders of Boom were very much in demand. They built tracks in Gentbrugge (1911), Wilrijk 'Garden City' (1916), Nice and Marseille (1920), Ostend (1921-1946), Brussel-Heizel (1932) and Oudenaarde (1933). The famous 'Kuipke' in Ghent (1922) and the even more famous Sportpaleis in Deurne (1933). In 2008, a book "De velodroombouwers Apostel-Mampaey" was published.

On 29 September 1956, road cycling world champion Stan Ockers died a few days after a crash in his 116th performance at the track. The UCI Track Cycling World Championships were held at the Sportpaleis in 1969 and 2001.

On 19 November 1988, Roy Orbison gave his last European performance at the Sportpaleis.

Janet Jackson was scheduled to perform during her All for You Tour on 29 November 2001, but the show was cancelled along with the rest of her European tour because of possible terrorist threats. The same happened on her 2016 Unbreakable World Tour, but because of scheduling conflicts.

In 2010, the arena's roof was replaced, and during 2011–2013 a €20million re-development took place, increasing its total capacity from 18,400 to 23,001 (including standing).

American R&B singer Beyoncé performed at the Sportpaleis as part of her The Beyoncé Experience Tour on 19 May 2007. She returned on 7 May 2009 for her I Am... World Tour and on 14 and 15 May 2013, as part of The Mrs. Carter Show World Tour, where she sold 33,000 tickets in just an hour. The first show on 14 May 2013 was cancelled three hours before the show and rescheduled to 31 May 2013. She subsequently beat her own record by selling 40,000 tickets in under one hour for two 2014 concerts at the venue.

Dutch symphonic metal band Within Temptation celebrated their 15th anniversary with a special show entitled "Elements" at the Sportpaleis. They were accompanied by the renowned Il Novecentro Orchestra and some special guests. The concert was held on 13 November 2012 and was sold out. Part of the concert was later released in the live album Let Us Burn – Elements & Hydra Live in Concert.

On 31 January 2015, the Antwerp Giants beat the attendance record for a basketball game in Belgium. The Belgian Basketball League team's 88–83 win over Spirou Charleroi was attended by 17,135 spectators.

In May 2019, the Final Four of the Basketball Champions League was hosted at the Sportpaleis, with Antwerp Giants being one of the playing teams.

In May 2022, The Major for Counter-Strike Global Offensive was hosted, featuring the world's best teams for one of the biggest esports events marking the first eSports event to be held in the arena.

Sport events

Concerts

Many world music stars have performed in this venue, including: 2 Unlimited, AC/DC, Adele, The Alan Parsons Project, Alice Cooper, Alicia Keys, Anastacia, André Rieu, Ariana Grande, Bastille, Beyoncé Knowles, The Black Eyed Peas, Bob Dylan, Bon Jovi, Boy George, Britney Spears, Bruce Springsteen, Bruno Mars, Bryan Adams, Celine Dion, Christina Aguilera, Coldplay, Deep Purple, Depeche Mode, Dimitri Vegas & Like Mike, Dua Lipa, The Eagles, Ellie Goulding, Eric Clapton, Faithless, Fleetwood Mac, Gotye, Green Day, Guns N' Roses, Gwen Stefani, Il Divo, Iron Maiden, Jean-Michel Jarre, Jennifer Lopez, John Fogerty, Jonas Brothers, Justin Bieber, Kanye West, Katy Perry, Kings of Leon, Kylie Minogue, Lady Gaga, Lana Del Rey, Lenny Kravitz, Leonard Cohen,, Lionel Richie, Madonna, Mark Knopfler, Massive Attack, Metallica, Michael Bublé, Mika, Milk Inc., Miley Cyrus, Muse, Neil Diamond, Nick Cave & The Bad Seeds, One Direction, Ozzy Osbourne, Paul McCartney, Pink Floyd, Pink, Placebo, Prince, Queen + Adam Lambert, Queen + Paul Rodgers, Queens of the Stone Age, Rage Against the Machine, Rammstein, Rihanna, The Rolling Stones, Roy Orbison, Sade, Santana, Samson en Gert, Scorpions, Shakira, Simply Red, Spice Girls, Sting, Steve Harley and Cockney Rebel (the largest venue the band has ever played), Supertramp, Tiësto, Tina Turner, U2, Whitney Houston, Within Temptation and Hans Zimmer.

2017

2018

2019

2020

2021

2022

2023

Audience
Billboard Magazine said the Sportpaleis was the second most visited event hall in the world between November 2007 and November 2008, with 1,239,436 visitors. Only Madison Square Garden in New York had more.

The arena can hold 23,001 people (including standing) after re-development which took place from 2011 to 2013.

Transport connections 

The Sportpaleis lies at the R. Grégoirplein square at the crossing of two large traffic axes, the Bisschoppenhoflaan/Schijnpoortweg, having an east–west orientation, and the Burgemeester Gabriel Theunisbrug, going north over the Albert Canal. In its immediate proximity also lies the Deurne highway ramp of the R1 ring road, as well as the Singel urban ring road. Also, nearby lie three car parks operated by the Sportpaleis, and two more car parks, of a nearby Gamma shop and the Antwerp slaughterhouse, which are also available when large events are held. Even so, traffic near the Sportpaleis can get extremely dense when such events are held, leading to large traffic jams and causing a nuisance with the inhabitants of the neighbourhood.

The Sportpaleis is also well connected to the Antwerp public transport system. Underground, next to the Sportpaleis, lies Sport premetro station, which is serviced by tram routes 2, 3 and 6, running between either Luchtbal or Merksem to the north and the city centre and the western or southern parts of the city in the other direction, via the Antwerp premetro network. Above ground also lies the terminus of tram route 12, following an above-ground trajectory toward the city centre and Zuid neighbourhood to the south. In addition to these, tram route 5 also has a stop called "Sportpaleis" near the premetro exit at the Ten Eekhovelei to the south of the complex. The route runs between Deurne and Wijnegem to the east and the city centre and Linkeroever to the west. Finally, it is also serviced by bus lines 19 and 413.

See also
 List of tennis stadiums by capacity
 List of indoor arenas in Belgium

References

External links

 

Indoor arenas in Belgium
Tennis venues in Belgium
Velodromes in Belgium
Sports venues in Antwerp Province
Sport in Antwerp
Culture in Antwerp
Buildings and structures in Antwerp
Gymnastics venues